James O'Hara may refer to:

 James O'Hara, 2nd Baron Tyrawley (1682–1774), British Army officer 
 James E. O'Hara (1844–1905), U.S. Representative from North Carolina
 James G. O'Hara (1925–1989), U.S. Representative from Michigan
 James O'Hara (announcer), Scottish former television announcer, now audio description specialist
 James O'Hara (quartermaster) (c. 1752–1819), Continental Army officer, U.S. Army quartermaster
 James O'Hara (actor) (1927–1992), Irish-born American actor, brother of Maureen O'Hara, credited as James Lilburn in Suddenly
 James O'Hara (1796–1838), Irish politician, Member of Parliament for Galway Borough 1826–1831

See also
 Jim O'Hara (born 1954) American businessman and politician
 Jim O'Hara (footballer) (1874–1960), Australian rules footballer 
 Jamie O'Hara (disambiguation)